The scarlet-banded barbet (Capito wallacei) is a species of bird in the New World barbet family, Capitonidae. It is endemic to Peru.

Taxonomy and systematics

The scarlet-belted barbet was discovered in 1996 and formally described in 2000. According to the International Ornithological Committee (IOC), the species is monotypic. However, the South American Classification Committee of the American Ornithological Society (AOS) and the Clements taxonomy include the "Sira barbet" (Capito fitzpatricki) as a subspecies of it. The Cornell Lab of Ornithology's Birds of the World acknowledges that the "Sira" form is significantly different from the nominate and suggests that it be accorded species rank.

Description

A strikingly colored species, its cap and nape are scarlet, while a broad white supercilium separates the crown from the black ear coverts. Most of the upperparts are black except for a yellow mid-back and large white rump patch. Below, the throat and upper breast are white, bordered below by a broad scarlet band, while the rest of the underparts are shades of yellow.

Distribution and habitat

The scarlet-banded barbet has been found only on a ridgetop known as Peak 1538 in the remote Cordillera Azul National Park in south-western Loreto, Peru. (It was mistakenly listed as being in Ucayali, Peru, in its formal description.)

Behavior

Feeding

The scarlet-banded barbet forages in the forest canopy. It was observed in small groups of the same species and in mixed-species foraging flocks. It feeds on fruits and seeds and probably takes insects as well.

Breeding

The scarlet-banded barbet specimens collected during the 1996 expedition indicate that the nesting season is probably March through May. No other information about its breeding habits has been published.

Vocalization

The scarlet-banded barbet's song is " a fast, low-pitched trill...'tdddddd-'"  that sounds like a woodpecker's drumming. Its call is a "guttural 'ggrrrakk'" .

Status

The IUCN has assessed the scarlet-banded barbet as Vulnerable. While it appears to be fairly common, its range is tiny and the total population has been estimated at fewer than 1000 individuals.

References

Additional reading

External links

 Recently described new species for the family New World Barbets and Allies at Ornitaxa.com
 
 
 
 

scarlet-banded barbet
Birds of the Peruvian Andes
Endemic birds of Peru
scarlet-banded barbet
scarlet-banded barbet
scarlet-banded barbet
Taxonomy articles created by Polbot